The 1904 United States presidential election in Alabama took place on November 8, 1904. All contemporary 45 states were part of the 1904 presidential election. Alabama voters chose eleven electors to the Electoral College, which selected the president and vice president.

Alabama was won by the Democratic nominees, Chief Judge Alton B. Parker of New York and his running mate Henry G. Davis of West Virginia. Due to the widespread disenfranchisement of African-Americans during the Jim Crow era, only 13 African-Americans in all of Sumter County voted in the 1904 Presidential election. All thirteen of whom voted for Theodore Roosevelt and all thirteen of whom would be prevented from voting in the next several presidential elections.

Results

Results by county

See also
United States presidential elections in Alabama

Notes

References

Alabama
1904
1904 Alabama elections